Gilles Müller (born 9 May 1983) is a Luxembourgish former professional tennis player. He is a two-time major singles quarterfinalist, and the most successful male tennis player in Luxembourgish history. Müller won two titles on the ATP Tour and achieved a career-high ATP singles ranking of world No. 21 on 31 July 2017. He was known for his powerful left-handed serve and net skills. Following his retirement, Müller was appointed as Luxembourg's Davis Cup team captain.

Career

Junior tennis
Müller played his first junior match in 1997 at the age of 14 at a grade 4 tournament in Luxembourg. 2001 was Müller's most successful year in juniors. He started off by making the semifinals of the Junior Australian Open where he lost to the No. 1 ranked junior Janko Tipsarević of Yugoslavia (1–6, 6–4, 2–6). Following an early exit at the Junior French Open, He reached the final of the Boys' Singles at the 2001 Wimbledon Championships, where he was defeated by Roman Valent of Switzerland (6–3, 5–7, 3–6). He won the Boys' Singles final at the 2001 US Open, defeating Taiwan's Yeu-Tzuoo Wang (7–6, 6–2). He attained No. 1 ranking on the junior circuit on September 10, 2001 and finished the year with the ranking. He ended his junior career after an early exit at the Orange Bowl with an overall singles record of 81–29 throughout his junior career.

Junior Grand Slam results - Singles:

Australian Open: SF (2001)
French Open: 3R (2001)
Wimbledon: F (2001)
US Open: W (2001)

2001–2003: The beginning
Although beginning to play ITF events in 2000, Müller did not turn pro until 2001 at the age of 18. Between April 2001 and August 2002, He won a total of four ITF futures events. He made his ATP debut at the 2002 Rosmalen Grass Court Championships after receiving a wildcard into the singles main draw where he lost in the first round to Ivo Heuberger (2–6, 6–3, 6–7(8–10)).

By the time 2003 came, Müller had already broke into the top 300 and started consistently playing in ATP Challenger Tour events where he made his first challenger final in April and won his first challenger title in July. He qualified for his second ATP event, the 2003 Copenhagen Open where he lost in the first round to Jean-René Lisnard (5–7, 4–6).

Müller entered the qualifying draws of the 2003 French Open and the 2003 US Open, losing both in the first round.

2004–2005: ATP Tour finals and wins against top-10 players
Müller began 2004 with his first ATP Tour match win at the 2004 Auckland Open where he defeated Nicolás Lapentti (7–5, 6–7(3–7), 6–1) and his first grand slam at the 2004 Australian Open where he lost in the first round to David Ferrer (6–7(4–7), 1–6, 3–6). His breakthrough event came at the 2004 Legg Mason Tennis Classic where he made his first ATP Tour final and defeated 1st seed and world No. 6 Andre Agassi (4–6, 5–7) to register his first win over a top-10 player. He lost in the final to 2nd seed and world No. 8 Lleyton Hewitt (3–6, 4–6). His result at the tournament would push his ranking into the top-100 for the first time in his career. He also defeated world No. 10 David Nalbandian (7–6(7–4), 3–6, 4–6,) at the 2004 Japan Open for his second win over a top-10 player. He finished 2004 his a year-end ranking of 69.

At the 2005 Wimbledon Championships, Müller stunned 4th seed and world No. 3 Rafael Nadal (6–4, 4–6, 6–3, 6–4) in the second round. He lost in the third round to 27th seed Richard Gasquet (6–7(3–7), 3–6, 3–6). He made his second ATP Tour final at the 2005 Los Angeles Open where he lost to top seed and world No. 6 Andre Agassi (4–6, 5–7). At the 2005 US Open, he stunned 4th seed and world No. 3 Andy Roddick (6–7(4–7), 6–7(8–10), 6–7(1–7)). He lost in the second round to eventual semifinalist Robby Ginepri (1–6, 1–6, 4–6). He finished 2005 with a year-end ranking of 76.

2006–2007: Back outside of the top 100
Müller's success started to die down in 2006. He started to get worse results in ATP events which dropped his ranking back outside of the top-100 to 105 by the end of the year. After January 2007, he returned to solely playing challenger events and had to start qualifying for grand slams and ATP events despite usually gaining automatic entry since 2005.

2008: First Grand Slam quarterfinal
At the 2008 US Open, Müller, ranked 130 at the time, had to go through the qualification tournament. He reached the main draw and advanced to the quarterfinals of a Grand Slam tournament for the first time in his career, earnining a win over fifth-seeded Nikolay Davydenko in the fourth round. He lost to defending and eventual champion Roger Federer in straight sets (6–7, 4–6, 6–7).

2009–2013: Struggles with injuries
On 19 January 2009, Müller beat Spaniard Feliciano López (6–3, 7–6, 4–6, 4–6, 16–14) in an epic four-hour, 24-minute match in the first round of the 2009 Australian Open. His run in the tournament ended in the third round by the eighth-seeded Juan Martín del Potro.

In September 2011, he advanced to the fourth round of the US Open, losing to Rafael Nadal, whom he had already lost to in the third round of Wimbledon earlier that same year.

Müller registered his 100th singles win by defeating Australian Marinko Matosevic (7–6, 6–4) in Atlanta. He also reached his first ATP final in seven years at the 2012 Atlanta Open final, losing to Andy Roddick (6–1, 6–7, 2–6) after the American came back from one set and one break down to win what would be Roddick's last final on the ATP Tour.

Müller's final match in 2013 was at the 2013 French Open where he lost in round 1 to Roberto Bautista Agut. He finished the year at No. 368 in the world rankings after missing the second half of the season with an elbow injury.

2014: Back inside the top 50
In January, Müller returned to playing tennis and competed mostly on the Challenger Tour, winning five titles.

Müller qualified for the 2014 Wimbledon Championships where he lost to Roger Federer in the second round.

Müller lost in the first round at the US Open to Paul-Henri Mathieu (7–6, 5–7, 6–7, 7–6, 1–6).

Müller lost to Federer in the first round of the 2014 Swiss Indoors before falling in the qualifying rounds of the Paris Masters. He finished the season with a ranking of No. 47 and was elected Luxembourg's Sportsman of the Year.

2015: Breaking the top 40
Müller began 2015 at the Aircel Chennai Open, where he made the quarterfinals, losing to eventual champion Stan Wawrinka. He then competed in the Sydney International losing in the semifinals to Viktor Troicki, the eventual champion. He put together his best Australian Open campaign to date, losing in the fourth round to world No. 1 and eventual champion Novak Djokovic (4–6, 5–7, 5–7). His performance during the entire month saw him crack the top 40 for the first time in his career on 2 February.

He had a strong showing in Rotterdam, defeating David Goffin and Grigor Dimitrov, and then lost to Wawrinka in the quarterfinals. However, he fell out of the top 50 for the first time of the year on 11 May because he didn't defend his titles on the Challenger Tour.

Müller had a strong start to the grass court season, reaching the semifinals of the Topshelf Open as well as the quarterfinals at Queen's, beating defending champion Dimitrov for the second time in two meetings since the beginning of the year. He then lost to eventual champion Andy Murray.

This was followed by a semifinals appearance at the 2015 BB&T Atlanta Open, where he eventually lost to Marcos Baghdatis in three sets (7–6, 3–6, 6–7).

He also reached the quarterfinals of the Moselle Open in addition to the semifinals of the Rakuten Japan Open Tennis Championships.

Müller finished the season with a world ranking of No. 38 and was elected Luxembourg's Sportsman of the Year for the second year in a row.

2016: Fourth and fifth ATP finals
He started 2016 by reaching the semifinals of both the Sydney International and the 2016 Garanti Koza Sofia Open.

At the 2016 Ricoh Open, he reached the final, losing to the defending champion Nicolas Mahut in straight sets. At the 2016 Aegon Open Nottingham, he reached the semifinals, falling to second-seeded Pablo Cuevas of Uruguay.

He advanced to the final of the Hall of Fame Tennis Championships, losing to second-seeded Ivo Karlović in three sets.

Müller represented Luxembourg in singles at the 2016 Summer Olympics, winning in the first round against Jerzy Janowicz and then beating Jo-Wilfried Tsonga in the second round before losing to Roberto Bautista Agut (4–6, 6–7).

At the 2016 Swiss Indoors, Müller defeated Grigor Dimitrov in the first round and then went on to reach the semifinals, falling to Kei Nishikori in three sets.

He finished 2016 with a ranking of No. 34 and was again elected Luxembourg's Sportsman of the Year.

2017: Career-best year, top 25 debut and career-high ranking
Müller finally won his maiden ATP World Tour title at the 2017 Sydney International, over a decade after his first final. He saved a match point in the first round against Alexandr Dolgopolov. This came less than a week after he lost in the men's doubles final of the 2017 Brisbane International, playing alongside Sam Querrey.

He also made the final of Estoril, losing to Pablo Carreño Busta in what was his first ATP final played on clay. This resulted in him reaching a singles ranking of 26.

Then, at the 2017 Ricoh Open aged 34, Müller set up the oldest ATP World Tour tournament singles final in 41 years against Ivo Karlović, aged 38. He won the match in two straight tiebreaks (7–6, 7–6), claiming his second ATP World Tour title in the process.

Despite being ranked 26 in the world, Müller's excellent form on grass in the last 12 months saw him earn a seeding of 16th at Wimbledon, where he made the quarterfinals after defeating world No. 2 Rafael Nadal in a five-set thriller, winning (6–3, 6–4, 3–6, 4–6, 15–13) in 4 hours and 48 minutes. The Luxembourger would subsequently have his run at The Championships ended by the eventual runner-up Marin Čilić, who beat him in another match that went five sets (6–3, 6–7, 5–7, 7–5, 1–6), after Müller experienced physical fatigue during the 5th set.

After reaching a career-high singles ranking of world No. 21 on 31 July and ending the season ranked world No. 25, he was elected Luxembourg's Sportsman of the Year for the fourth year in a row.

2018: Final season
Müller entered an ATP tournament as a defending champion for the first time in his career at the 2018 Sydney International, ousting John Millman before subsequently losing to Benoît Paire. He then reached the third round of the 2018 Australian Open, ultimately bowing out to Pablo Carreño Busta in four sets.

Müller announced on 16 July that he would retire at the end of the season. He played his last match on the ATP World Tour at the 2018 US Open, losing in a five-setter to Lorenzo Sonego in the first round.

Müller was honored as one of the biggest retirees of the year at the 2018 ATP Finals alongside Florian Mayer and André Sá.

National representation

Davis Cup
Müller made his Davis Cup debut for the Luxembourg Davis Cup team in April 2000 at the age of 16. He competed in 30 ties and out of 73 matches, he won 56 and lost 17, which made him Luxembourg's most successful Davis Cup player. Following his retirement in 2018, Müller was appointed as Luxembourg's Davis Cup team captain.

Müller led the team to a surprise victory against Finland in February 2004.

Olympic Games
Müller qualified for the Olympic Games twice: in London 2012 and in Rio 2016, reaching the second round at the former and the third round at the latter.

At the 2016 Summer Olympics Parade of Nations, Müller was the official flagbearer for Luxembourg.

ATP career finals

Singles: 8 (2 titles, 6 runner-ups)

Doubles: 2 (2 runner-ups)

ATP Challenger and ITF Futures finals

Singles: 31 (15–16)

Doubles: 10 (4–6)

Junior Grand Slam finals

Singles: 2 (1 title, 1 runner-up)

Performance timelines

Singles

Doubles

Wins over top 10 players

Record against top 10 players
Müller's ATP-only record against players who have been ranked world No. 10 or higher. Statistics correct as of 12 October 2020.

References

External links

 
 
 
 Gilles Müller at stevegtennis.com

Luxembourgian male tennis players
People from Schifflange
1983 births
Living people
US Open (tennis) junior champions
Tennis players at the 2012 Summer Olympics
Tennis players at the 2016 Summer Olympics
Olympic tennis players of Luxembourg
Grand Slam (tennis) champions in boys' singles